Anna Zofia Pakuła-Sacharczuk (born 10 August 1956) is a Polish politician. She was elected to the Sejm on 25 September 2005, getting 8,675 votes in 23 Rzeszów district as a candidate from the Law and Justice list.

See also
Members of Polish Sejm 2005-2007

External links
Anna Pakuła-Sacharczuk - parliamentary page - includes declarations of interest, voting record, and transcripts of speeches.

1956 births
Living people
People from Płońsk
Members of the Polish Sejm 2005–2007
Women members of the Sejm of the Republic of Poland
Law and Justice politicians
21st-century Polish women politicians
John Paul II Catholic University of Lublin alumni